

The Boisavia B.260 Anjou (later developed by SIPA as the Sipavia Anjou) was a four-seat twin-engine light aircraft developed in France in the 1950s. It was a low-wing cantilever monoplane of conventional configuration with retractable tricycle undercarriage.  Intended by Boisavia as a touring aircraft, it did not find a market and only the single prototype was constructed. At this point, the firm sold the design to SIPA, which modified the design and re-engined it with Lycoming O-360 engines, but found that they could not sell it either. At a time when the twin-engine light plane market was already dominated by all-metal American aircraft, the Anjou's fabric-over-tube construction was something of an anachronism, and all development was soon ceased. Plans to develop a stretched version with three extra seats and Potez 4D engines were also abandoned.

Variants
 B.260 - Boisavia prototype with Regnier 4L engines (1 built)
 S.261 - SIPA conversion with Lycoming O-360 engines (1 converted)
 S.262 - Planned seven-seat version (not built)

Specifications (B.260)

References

Further reading

External links
 aviafrance.com
 luftfahrt-archiv.de

Anjou
Abandoned civil aircraft projects
1950s French civil utility aircraft
SIPA aircraft
Low-wing aircraft
Aircraft first flown in 1956
Twin piston-engined tractor aircraft